The Rideau Falls are two 11-metre waterfalls located in Ottawa, Ontario, Canada, where the Rideau River empties into the  Ottawa River. The falls are divided by Green Island,  with Ottawa's Old City Hall just to the south. To the west of the falls is the headquarters of the National Research Council while to the east are the Canada and the World Pavilion and the French Embassy. Samuel de Champlain described the falls as "...a marvelous fall...it descends a height of twenty or twenty-five fathoms with such impetuosity that it makes an arch nearly four hundred paces broad."  The falls were named by the early French for their resemblance to a curtain, or rideau in French. The Rideau River was later named after the falls. The Rideau Canal was constructed to bypass these falls and the Hog's Back Falls.

References

Further reading

External links

 Flickr Photos of Rideau Falls

Waterfalls of Ontario
Landforms of Ottawa
Tourist attractions in Ottawa